Lankatilaka Vihara is a Buddhist temple situated in Udunuwara of Kandy, Sri Lanka. It is considered as the most magnificent architectural edifice created during the Gampola era.

History
The history of the temple goes back to the 14th century. According to historical reports this temple was built by King Bhuvanekabahu IV, who reigned from 1341 to 1351 A. D. He entrusted the construction of this temple to his Chief Minister named Senalankadhikara, who successfully finished the works of this temple. The architecture of the temple was designed by a South Indian architect named Sathapati Rayar. According to the Professor Senarath Paranavithana, Sathapati Rayar designed this temple using Tamil Pandya sculptors brought from Tamil Nadu in Hindu style.. in 13th century AD. Polonnaruwa era and also with other Dravidian and Indo Chinese architectural patterns.

The temple

The vihara buildings have been built on a natural rock called Panhalgala Rock. Among the buildings the image house possess characteristically outstanding architectural features, embellished with traditional Sinhalese sculptures. According to the facts recorded in the Lankatilake copper plaque, this image house was construct as a four storied mansion with height of eighty feet, but today only 3 stories can be seen. The walls and the ceiling of the image house has been adorned with the Kandyan era paintings and sculptures.

Rock curved inscriptions found in the temple premises with both Sinhala and Tamil sections, proclaim about the initiators and the facilities gifted to this temple by the kings.

Devales
The image house of the Lankatilaka is enriched with six devales. The gods: Upulvan; Ganapathi; Saman; Vibhishana, Kataragama deviyo and Kumara Bandara are worshipped here. Kumara bandara is believed to be the deity, who protects the Lankatilaka vihara.

See also
 List of Archaeological Protected Monuments in Sri Lanka

References

Buddhist temples in Kandy District
Archaeological protected monuments in Kandy District